The Vršac Mountains ( / Vršačke planine), also known as Vršac Hill ( / Vršački breg), are located in the Banat region near the city of Vršac, Serbia and partially also in Romania. They represent an independent and distinct massif, 19 kilometers long and spreading on an area of 170 square kilometers, of which 122 belong to Serbia and 48 to Romania.

Geography
The Vršac mountains have a shape of an arch, where the basic mountain mass takes the central position, while the hills extend to the south and north. The mountains are built of Paleozoic rocks (which date back over 260 million years) which are surrounded by Neogene sediments (about 60 mya), including those of the ancient Pannonian sea (about 25 mya). Contrary to some literature data, the Vršac Mountains are not part of the Carpathians but are a Pannonian island mountain according to their geotectonic position and geological structure. Specific forms of geomorphological diversity, naturally sculpted – made of gneiss and schist are represented in solitary or clustered hummocks.

Peaks
In respect to the appearance of the Vršac mountains, four distinct shapes are clearly visible: 
The Tower of Vršac (Vršačka kula), 399 m
The Fox Head (Lisičija glava), with its three peaks:
The Gudurica peak (Gudurički vrh), the highest peak of Vojvodina, with its 641 m altitude
The Vršac Peak (Vršački vrh), 590 m
Lower Vršišor (Donji Vršišor), 463 m

Between them there are vast rifts. Turska glava (402 m), Đakov vrh (449 m), and Kamenarica are also interesting places for climbers.

Fauna
Owing to the exceptional natural conditions, the Vršac mountains with 120 registered species of birds are one of the richest ornithological habitats in Vojvodina and the whole Serbia. It is necessary to mention some other representatives of the fauna, like grey and red fox, deer, wild boars and wolves that appear from time to time.

Vršac Mountains have been classified since 1982 as a "landscape of outstanding features" in the national Registry of Protected Natural Resources.

Culture
The most important cultural monuments include The Tower of Vršac from the 15th century and Mesić monastery, which according to the documents from 18th century was built in the 15th century, while tradition claim that it was erected in 1225.

References

External links
 The Vršac Mountains
 Rare Birds Of Vršac Mountains

Geography of Vojvodina
Mountain ranges of Romania
Banat
Vršac
Mountains of Serbia
Pannonian island mountains